Borisodon is an extinct genus of eutherians which existed in what is now Kazakhstan during the Turonian age. It was described by J. David Archibald and Alexander Averianov in 2012, as a new genus for the species Sorlestes kara, which was originally described by Nessov in 1993. The type specimen was a mandible (CCMGE 101/12455), discovered at Near Ashchikol' Lake, drill core. Borisodon was a tree-climbing insectivore.

References

Prehistoric eutherians
Cretaceous mammals of Asia
Fossil taxa described in 2012
Prehistoric mammal genera